Haljerd (also Romanized as Halījerd, Halah Jerd, Halajerd, and Halajird) is a village in Kamalabad Rural District, in the Central District of Karaj County, Alborz Province, Iran. At the 2006 census, its population was 31, in 11 families.

References 

Populated places in Karaj County